Dijon is the prefecture of the Côte-d'Or department and of the Bourgogne-Franche-Comté region in eastern France.  the commune had a population of 156,920.

The earliest archaeological finds within the city limits of Dijon date to the Neolithic period. Dijon later became a Roman settlement named Divio, located on the road between Lyon and Paris. The province was home to the Dukes of Burgundy from the early 11th until the late 15th centuries, and Dijon became a place of tremendous wealth and power, one of the great European centres of art, learning, and science.

The city has retained varied architectural styles from many of the main periods of the past millennium, including Capetian, Gothic, and Renaissance. Many still-inhabited town-houses in the city's central district date from the 18th century and earlier. Dijon's architecture is distinguished by, among other things, toits bourguignons (Burgundian polychrome roofs) made of tiles glazed in terracotta: green, yellow, and black and arranged in geometric patterns.

Dijon holds an International and Gastronomic Fair every year in the northern-hemisphere autumn. With over 500 exhibitors and 200,000 visitors every year, it is one of the ten most important fairs in France. Dijon also hosts every three years the international flower show Florissimo. Dijon has become famous for Dijon mustard, which originated in 1856, when Jean Naigeon of Dijon substituted verjuice, the acidic "green" juice of not-quite-ripe grapes, for vinegar in the traditional mustard recipe. Dijon is a green city with an important tertiary sector, as well as a regional economic center with a diversified fabric, a traditional food-processing center (Dijon crême de cassis and kir, gingerbread, Lanvin chocolate...) and a renowned pharmaceutical sector.

On 4 July 2015, UNESCO registered the historical centre of the city as a World Heritage site, as one of the components of the "Climats, terroirs of Burgundy" site, because of its historical importance in regulating the system of wine production in Burgundy.

History

The earliest archaeological finds within the city limits of Dijon date to the Neolithic period. Dijon later became a Roman settlement called Divio, which may mean sacred fountain, located on the road from Lyon to Paris. Saint Benignus, the city's apocryphal patron saint, is said to have introduced Christianity to the area before being martyred.

This province was home to the Dukes of Burgundy from the early 11th until the late 15th century, and Dijon was a place of tremendous wealth and power and one of the great European centres of art, learning, and science. The Duchy of Burgundy was key in the transformation of medieval times toward early modern Europe. The Palace of the Dukes of Burgundy now houses the city hall and a museum of art.

In 1513, Swiss and Imperial armies invaded Burgundy and besieged Dijon, which was defended by the governor of the province, Louis II de la Trémoille. The siege was extremely violent, but the town succeeded in resisting the invaders. After long negotiations, Louis II de la Trémoille managed to persuade the Swiss and the Imperial armies to withdraw their troops and also to return three hostages who were being held in Switzerland. During the siege, the population called on the Virgin Mary for help and saw the town's successful resistance and the subsequent withdrawal of the invaders as a miracle. For those reasons, in the years following the siege the inhabitants of Dijon began to venerate Notre-Dame de Bon-Espoir (Our Lady of Good Hope). Although a few areas of the town were destroyed, there are nearly no signs of the siege of 1513 visible today. However, Dijon's museum of fine arts has a large tapestry depicting this episode in the town's history: it shows the town before all subsequent destruction (particularly that which occurred during the French Revolution) and is an example of 16th-century art.

Dijon was also occupied by anti-Napoleonic coalitions in 1814, by the Prussian army in 1870–71, and by Nazi Germany beginning in June 1940, during WWII, when it was bombed by US Air Force B-17 Flying Fortresses, before the liberation of Dijon by the French Army and the French Resistance, 11 September 1944.

Geography
Dijon is situated at the heart of a plain drained by two small converging rivers: the Suzon, which crosses it mostly underground from north to south, and the Ouche, on the southern side of town. Farther south is the côte, or hillside, of vineyards that gives the department its name.

Climate
Dijon features an oceanic climate (Cfb) with continental influence under the Köppen climate classification. The city is highly influenced by its position far inland in Northeastern France. Thus, winters are cool to cold with moderate frosts at night and thawing conditions during the day while summers are warm to hot and humid with frequent thunderstorms.

Sights

Dijon has a large number of churches, including Notre Dame de Dijon, St. Philibert, St. Michel, and Dijon Cathedral, dedicated to the apocryphal Saint Benignus, the crypt of which is over 1,000 years old. The city has retained varied architectural styles from many of the main periods of the past millennium, including Capetian, Gothic and Renaissance. Many still-inhabited town houses in the city's central district date from the 18th century and earlier. Dijon architecture is distinguished by, among other things, toits bourguignons (Burgundian polychrome roofs) made of tiles glazed in terracotta, green, yellow and black and arranged in geometric patterns.

Dijon was largely spared the destruction of wars such as the 1870 Franco-Prussian War and the Second World War, despite the city being occupied. Therefore, many of the old buildings such as the half-timbered houses dating from the 12th to the 15th centuries (found mainly in the city's core district) are undamaged, at least by organized violence.

Dijon is home to many museums, including the Musée des Beaux-Arts de Dijon in part of the Ducal Palace (see below). It contains, among other things, ducal kitchens dating back to the mid-15th century, and a substantial collection of primarily European art, from Roman times through the present.

Among the more popular sights is the Ducal Palace, the Palais des Ducs et des États de Bourgogne or "Palace of the Dukes and the States of Burgundy", which includes one of only a few remaining examples of Capetian period architecture in the region. Many art interested visitors flock to the Puits de Moïse or Well of Moses, a monumental sculpture by Claus Sluter.
 
The church of Notre Dame is famous for both its art and architecture. Popular legend has it that one of its stone relief sculptures, an owl (la chouette) is a good-luck charm: visitors to the church touch the owl with their left hands to make a wish. (The current carving was restored after it was damaged by vandalism in the night of 5 and 6 January 2001).

The Grand Théâtre de Dijon, built in 1828 and one of the main performing venues of the Opéra de Dijon, was declared a monument historique of France in 1975. It was designed by the Dijon-born architect Jacques Cellerier (1742–1814) in the Neo-classical style with an interior modelled on Italian opera houses.

Transport

Roads 
The A31 provides connections to Nancy, Lille and Lyon. The A39 connects Dijon with Bourg-en-Bresse and Geneva, the A36 with Besançon, Mulhouse and Basel.

Water transport 
The Canal de Bourgogne passes through the heart of Dijon and creates a navigable route to Paris in the north-west via the river Yonne, a tributary of the river Seine, and to the Saône river 25 km to the south-east. The canal joins the Saône at Saint-Jean-de-Losne which is the barging centre of France and Europe. In addition to the connection to the Atlantic via the Seine it has navigable water connections to the Mediterranean—via the Saône to the Rhône river at Lyon and further south (ultimately west to the Atlantic via the Canal du Midi)—Germany and central Europe—via the Rhône-Rhine canal—plus west to the centre and river Loire via the Canal du Centre. These waterways were largely completed before the 19th century and were the main means of industrial transport until the railways began taking over in the mid-19th century. Today they form a water route for mostly pleasure craft between northern Europe and the south. For example the route through Dijon is popular with those sailing their boats from the United Kingdom to the Mediterranean.

Public transport

Trains 
Dijon is an important railway junction for lines from Paris to Lyon and Marseille, and the east–west lines to Besançon, Belfort, Nancy, Switzerland, and Italy. The city of Nice takes about six hours by TGV and Strasbourg only 1 hour and 56 minutes via the TGV Rhin-Rhône. Dijon has a direct overnight sleeper/couchette service to Milan, Verona and Venice by the operator Thello. Numerous regional TER Bourgogne-Franche-Comté trains depart from the same station. There is another railway station east of the city centre, Dijon-Porte-Neuve station, on the line to Is-sur-Tille and Culmont-Chalindrey.

Trams 
A new tram system opened in September 2012. Line T1 is an  line with 16 stations running west–east from the Dijon railway station to Quetigny.

Culture
Dijon holds its International and Gastronomic Fair every year in autumn. With over 500 exhibitors and 200,000 visitors every year, it is one of the ten most important fairs in France. Dijon is also home, every three years, to the international flower show Florissimo.

Dijon has numerous museums such as the Musée des Beaux-Arts de Dijon, the Musée Archéologique, the Musée de la Vie Bourguignonne, the Musée d'Art Sacré, and the Musée Magnin. It also contains approximately 700 hectares of parks and green space, including the Jardin botanique de l'Arquebuse.

Dijon is home to the prominent contemporary art centre Le Consortium, a fine-arts school (ENSA), as well as a number of art galleries like the Fonds régional d'art contemporain, which holds a permanent collection including pieces by locally established artist Yan Pei-Ming.

Apart from the numerous bars, which sometimes have live bands, some popular music venues in Dijon are : Le Zenith de Dijon, La Vapeur, l'Espace autogéré des Tanneries and l'Atheneum.

Dijon mustard originated in 1856, when Jean Naigeon of Dijon substituted verjuice, the acidic "green" juice of not-quite-ripe grapes, for vinegar in the traditional mustard recipe. In general, mustards from Dijon today contain white wine rather than verjuice.  Dijon mustard is not necessarily produced near Dijon, as the term is regarded as genericized under European Union law, so that it cannot be registered for protected designation of origin status. Most Dijon mustard (brands such as Amora or Maille) is produced industrially and over 90% of mustard seed used in local production is imported, mainly from Canada. In 2008, Unilever closed its Amora mustard factory in Dijon. Dijon mustard shops sell exotic or unusually-flavoured mustard (fruit-flavoured, for example), often sold in decorative hand-painted faience (china) pots.

Burgundy is a world-famous wine growing region, and notable vineyards, such as Vosne-Romanée and Gevrey-Chambertin, are within 20 minutes of the city center. The town's university boasts a renowned enology institute. The road from Santenay to Dijon is known as the "route des Grands Crus", where eight of the world's top ten most expensive wines are produced, according to Wine Searcher.

The city is also well known for its crème de cassis, or blackcurrant liqueur, used in the drink known as "Kir", named after former mayor of Dijon canon Félix Kir, a mixture of crème de cassis with white wine, traditionally Bourgogne Aligoté.

Dijon is home to Dijon FCO, a men's football team now in Ligue 1, and Dijon FCO, a women's team now in Division 1 Féminine. Dijon has a its own (Pro A) basketball club, JDA Dijon Basket. The Palais des Sports de Dijon serves as playground for the team and hosted international basketball events such as the FIBA EuroBasket 1999 in the past. Dijon is home to the Dijon Ducs ice hockey team, who play in the Magnus League. To the northwest, the race track of Dijon-Prenois hosts various motor sport events. It hosted the Formula 1 French Grand Prix on five occasions from 1974 to 1984.

Colleges and universities
 Dijon hosts the main campus of the University of Burgundy
 École nationale des beaux-arts de Dijon
 European Campus of Sciences Po Paris
 Agrosup Dijon
 Burgundy School of Business

Population

Personalities

 John the Fearless (1371–1419), Duke of Burgundy
 Charles the Bold (1433–1477), Duke of Burgundy
 Claude-Louis Navier, mechanical engineer & physicist
 Jean Le Fèvre (canon) (1493–1565), lexicographer
 Charles Poisot (1822–1904), musicologist
 Edmond Debeaumarché (1906–1959), hero of the French Resistance
 Christian Allard (b. 1964), Member of the Scottish Parliament
 Claude Balbastre (1724–1799), composer
 Cécile Bart (born 1958), artist
 Jean-Marc Boivin (1951–1990), extreme sports specialist
 Fabrice Brégier (born in 1961), businessman, Chief Operating Officer of Airbus
 Antoine Bret (1717–1792), French playwright
 Jacques-Bénigne Bossuet (1627–1704), bishop and theologist
 Madjid Bougherra (b. 1982), Rangers F.C. footballer
 Thierry Caens (b. 1958), classical trumpeter
 Laurent Chambertin (b. 1966), volleyball player
 Jane Frances de Chantal (Jeanne–Françoise Frémiot, baronne de Chantal, 1572–1641), founder of the Visitation Order
 François Chaussier (1746–1828), physician
 Anne-Caroline Chausson (b. 1977), Olympic medalist in cycling
 Bernard Courtois (1777–1838), discoverer of the element iodine
 Charles Joseph Minard (1781–1870), civil engineer and first information graphics
 Henry Darcy (1803–1858), engineer
 Jean-Jacques-Joseph Debillemont (1824–1879), conductor and operetta composer
 Alexandre Gustave Eiffel (1832–1923), engineer and architect
 Eugène Foveau (1886–1957), classical trumpeter
 Roger Guillemin (b. 1924), Nobel laureate in Physiology and Medicine
 Hermine Horiot (born 1986), classical cellist
 Claude Jade (1948–2006), actress
 Joseph Jacotot (1770–1840), educational philosopher
 François Jouffroy (1806–1882), sculptor
 Henri Legrand du Saulle (1830–1886), psychiatrist
 Jean-Baptiste Gondelier (1792–1852), playwright
 Jean-Pierre Marielle (1932–2019), actor
 Julien Pillet (b. 1977), Olympic medalist in sabre fencer
 Nicolas Quentin (d. 1636), historical painter
 Jean-Philippe Rameau (1683–1764), composer
 Claude-François-Marie Rigoley, comte d'Ogny, (1756–1790), cellist
 François Rude (1784–1855), sculptor
 Elizabeth of the Trinity (Marie–Élisabeth Catez, 1880–1906), Carmelite nun and religious writer
 Vitalic (born as Pascal Arbez in 1976), electronic music artist

Twin towns - sister cities
Dijon is twinned with:

 Białystok, Poland, since 1996
 Cluj-Napoca, Romania
 Chefchaouen, Morocco
 Dakar, Senegal
 Dallas, United States, since 1957
 Guimarães, Portugal
 Mainz, Germany, since 1958

 Prague 6, Czech Republic
 Reggio Emilia, Italy, since 1963
 Skopje, North Macedonia, since 1961
 Volgograd, Russia, since 1960
 York, United Kingdom, since 1953

Sport
The JDA Dijon is a French basketball club, based in Dijon.

The city's premier football team is Dijon FCO. They play in Ligue 2 after being relegated from Ligue 1 in 2021.

See also
Communes of the Côte-d'Or department
Palace of the Dukes of Burgundy
Radio Shalom Dijon

Notes

References

Further reading

External links

 
Dijon Tourism - Dijon Metropole Tourist Office

 
Communes of Côte-d'Or
Prefectures in France
Lingones
Burgundy
Cities in France